The Assumption of the Virgin Mary does not appear in the New Testament, but appears in apocryphal literature of the 3rd and 4th centuries, and by 1000 was widely believed in the Western Church, though not made formal Catholic dogma until 1950.  It first became a popular subject in Western Christian art in the 12th century, along with other narrative scenes from the Life of the Virgin, and the Coronation of the Virgin.  These "Marian" subjects were especially promoted by the Cistercian Order and Saint Bernard of Clairvaux (d. 1153).

Literary accounts with more detail, such as the presence of the Apostles, appeared in late medieval works such as the Golden Legend, and were followed by artists.  By the end of the Middle Ages, large and crowded altarpieces gave the artist the opportunity to show his virtuosity in composition, colouring and figure poses.  After the Reformation, it was used to assert the Catholic position, rejected by Protestants.

Normally accompanied or carried by angels (but not usually carried by Christ, as in Orthodox icons) the Virgin Mary rises passively heavenward, where she is to be crowned by Christ, while the Apostles below surround her empty tomb as they stare up in awe.  God the Father or Christ (as in the Orthodox Dormition) may be seen in the heavens above.  She may be surrounded with an almond-shaped mandorla.  Her hands are usually clasped in prayer in medieval images, but later may be thrown wide, as she gazes up, as in Titian's highly influential altarpiece for the Frari Church (1515–18) in Venice, which agitated the previously decorous apostles.  Examples include works by El Greco, Rubens (several compositions), Annibale Caracci, and Nicolas Poussin, the last replacing the Apostles with putti throwing flowers into the tomb.

Iconographic details
Some versions show the Virgin dropping her belt, the Girdle of Thomas, to Thomas the Apostle (best known for his Doubting Thomas episode) as she rises; this was to give him tangible proof of what he had seen, given his earlier scepticism. The "girdle" was a major relic of the Middles Ages, naturally existing in several versions.  In a miniature by the Master of James IV of Scotland (1510s), an angel passes it down to Thomas.  This also has the unusual scene of the funeral procession with the Apostles.

Rubens introduced two women, perhaps meant to be Martha and Mary, kneeling by the sarcophagus or bending over it. Having apparently unwrapped the shroud, they are usually holding it and collecting the roses found within.  This motif was often included by later Flemish artists.

Although the final age of Mary is not given in the New Testament, from the Gospel evidence she was at least in her forties, and the Golden Legend gives her age at death as sixty or seventy-two. In paintings of the Crucifixion of Jesus and the following events, she is normally depicted as a fairly old woman. But most Assumptions give her a youthful or mature appearance, with exceptions like the Panciatichi Assumption by Andrea del Sarto, of c. 1522–23.  By contrast the apostles are very often depicted as old men, with the youngest, Saint John, merely in his prime.  From the later 16th century some images show a more intimate depiction in the in aria type of sacra conversatione, with a few selected saints replacing the crowd of apostles, and often the Virgin hovering not much above them.

The alternative Catholic scene from the end of the Virgin Mary's early life is the Death of the Virgin, which was more compatible with the Dormition of the Theotokos in Eastern Orthodox art and theology.  Most treatments showed her lying in bed, surrounded by the Twelve Apostles, again reflecting the Golden Legend.  Some painters show both scenes, one above the other.  Catholic doctrine, still emerging when most of these were painted, has declined to specify whether Mary had died before her bodily Assumption, although the slightly varying accounts given one after the other in late versions of the Golden Legend agree that she did, and was placed in a tomb, from which she was raised up three days later. 

Though once common in Catholic art, the last major treatment of the Death of the Virgin by itself was Caravaggio's painting in the Louvre, who caused a stir by depicting her as an untidy and realistic corpse, which some considered a breach of decorum, though compatible with the doctrine of the Church.

The Assumption was a suitable subject for illusionistic ceiling paintings, and  first so used at Parma Cathedral by Antonio da Correggio in 1526–1530.  The first Baroque ceiling was by Giovanni Lanfranco in 1625–1627 at San Andrea della Valle in Rome.

Selected works

With articles
 Assumption of the Virgin (Andrea del Castagno), 1449–50
 Assumption of the Virgin by Francesco Botticini 1475–76
 Assumption of the Virgin (Perugino) 1506
 Heller Altarpiece, 1507–09, Albrecht Dürer
 Corciano Altarpiece, Perugino, 1513
 Assumption of the Virgin (Palma Vecchio), c. 1513
 Assumption of the Virgin (Rosso Fiorentino), 1513–14
 Assumption of the Virgin by Titian, 1515–1518
 Assumption of the Virgin (Fra Bartolomeo) c. 1516
 Panciatichi Assumption, Andrea del Sarto, c. 1522–23
 Assumption of the Virgin (Moretto), Moretto da Brescia, 1524–25
 Assumption Altarpiece by Moretto da Brescia, 1529–30.
 Assumption of the Virgin by Antonio da Correggio, 1526–1530
 Assumption of the Virgin, by El Greco, c. 1577–79
 Assumption of the Virgin by Annibale Carracci, 1590
 Cerasi Assumption by Annibale Carracci, 1600–01
 Assumption of the Virgin (Gentileschi) (Orazio), 1605–1608
 Assumption (Guercino), c.1623
 Assumption of the Virgin by Peter Paul Rubens, 1626, the Cathedral of Our Lady, Antwerp
 Assumption of the Virgin Mary (Rubens, 1637), Liechtenstein Collection

Other
 The Assumption of the Virgin by Bernardo Daddi, c. 1337–1339
 The Assumption of the Virgin with St. Thomas and Two Donors (Ser Palamedes and his Son Matthew) by Andrea di Bartolo, c. 1390s
 The Dormition and the Assumption of the Virgin by Fra Angelico, 1424–1434
 Assumption of the Virgin by Michaelangelo di Pietro Membrini, c. 1498
 The Assumption of the Virgin, with the Nativity, the Resurrection, the Adoration of the Magi, the Ascension of Christ, Saint Mark and an Angel, and Saint Luke and an Ox by Joachim Patinir, c. 1510–1518
 Assumption of the Virgin (L'Assomption) by Jacques Callot, c. 1592–1635
 Assumption of the Virgin by Giovanni Lanfranco, before 1647
 Assumption of the Virgin by Guercino, 1650
 The Assumption of the Virgin by Giambattista Piazetta, 1735
 Virgin of the Apocalypse by Gaetano Gandolfi, 1770–1780
 The Assumption of the Virgin, by Martin Johann Schmidt, called Kremser-Schmidt, 1773

Gallery

Notes

References

 Baumstark, Reinhold, Liechtenstein: The Princely Collections, 1985, Editors: Bradford D. Kelleher, John P. O'Neill, Metropolitan Museum of Art and Sammlungen des Regierenden Fürsten von Liechtenstein, Google books
 Caxton, William, English edition of the Golden Legend, in English translation, probably by an unknown cleric, Story of the Assumption
 Hall, James (1996), Hall's Dictionary of Subjects and Symbols in Art, 1996 (2nd edn.), John Murray, 
 Hall, James (1983), A History of Ideas and Images in Italian Art, 1983, John Murray, London, 
 

Paintings of the Assumption of the Virgin
Entering heaven alive
Virgin Mary in art